The Osella PA21 is a series of Group CN sports prototype race cars, developed and built by Italian manufacturer Osella. The cars mostly compete in hillclimb races, trials, and events.

References 

Sports prototypes
Osella vehicles
Mid-engined cars